Stadionul Orășenesc (Russian: Gorodskoi Stadion) is a multi-use stadium in Rîbnița, Moldova. It is currently used mostly for football matches and served as the home for FC Iskra-Stali Rîbnița of the Moldovan National Division. The stadium has a capacity of 4,500 spectators.

References

Football venues in Moldova
Football venues in Transnistria
Rîbnița